Breyton Avron Poole (born 23 March 2000 in Cape Town) is a South African high jumper.

He won the gold medal at the 2017 World U18 Championships, the bronze medal at the 2018 World U20 Championships, the bronze medal at 2019 African Games, the gold medal at the 2019 African U20 Championships and finished fourth at the 2019 Summer Universiade. He also competed at the 2018 Commonwealth Games without reaching the final.

References

2000 births
Living people
South African male high jumpers
Athletes (track and field) at the 2018 Commonwealth Games
Commonwealth Games competitors for South Africa
Athletes (track and field) at the 2019 African Games
African Games bronze medalists for South Africa
African Games medalists in athletics (track and field)
Competitors at the 2019 Summer Universiade
Sportspeople from Cape Town
World Youth Championships in Athletics winners